Zhong Jinyu (born April 5, 1983 in Wuhua, Guangdong) is a female Chinese football (soccer) player who competed at the 2004 Summer Olympics.

In 2004, she was a squad member of the Chinese team which finished ninth in the women's tournament.

External links
profile

1983 births
Living people
Chinese women's footballers
Footballers at the 2004 Summer Olympics
Hakka sportspeople
Sportspeople from Meizhou
Olympic footballers of China
People from Wuhua
Women's association football defenders